Pardanjan (also Romanized as Pardanjān, Pardenjān, and Pordanjān; also known as Vardanjān) is a city in Junqan District of Farsan County, Chaharmahal and Bakhtiari province, Iran. At the 2006 census, its population was 7,370 in 1,624 households, when it was a village in the Central District. The following census in 2011 counted 8,088 people in 1,246 households, by which time it had been raised to the status of a city in the recently established Junqan District. The latest census in 2016 showed a population of 8,699 people in 2,364 households. The city is populated by Lurs.

References 

Farsan County

Cities in Chaharmahal and Bakhtiari Province

Populated places in Chaharmahal and Bakhtiari Province

Populated places in Farsan County

Luri settlements in Chaharmahal and Bakhtiari Province